Pristobrycon striolatus is a species of serrasalmid fish.

Range and habitat 
Pristobrycon striolatus inhabits mainly black or acidic waters in tributaries in the Orinoco and Amazon River Basins.

Description 
This small and beautiful fish reaches . Its body is discoid with the anterodorsal profile slightly curved or straight. The head is robust and wide. Its snout is blunt. A preanal spine is absent. The adipose fin is wide. The head is silver with metallic orange to red at the mandibular and opercular regions. Its iris is yellow. Its body is greenish laterally and a mixture of orange and red at the abdominal area, covered with "pepper-like" spots. It has a single spot in the opercular area above the pectoral fin origin. Fins have reddish tones. Its caudal fin has an angled basal black band.

Feeding 
Along with other members of the group, P. striolatus is a predator, consuming smaller fish and attacking fins. Juveniles eat aquatic insects and crustaceans (shrimps). Occasionally, diet includes fruits from the surrounding gallery forest. This is a solitary, non-schooling species.

Etymology 
Pygopristis antoni Fernández-Yépez, 1965 is a synonym of this species. Other names are: Serrasalmo scapularis (part) Gunther, 1864; Pygopristis gibbosus Starks, 1913; Pygocentrus striolatus Fernández-Yépez, 1969; Serrasalmus striolatus Norman, 1929.

References 

 Machado-Allison, A. y W. Fink. 1996. Los peces caribes de Venezuela: diagnosis, claves, espectos ecológicos y evolutivos. Universidad Central de Venezuela CDCH, (Colección Monografías) 52. 149p.  Caracas, Venezuela.

Fish of Venezuela
Serrasalmidae
Taxa named by Franz Steindachner
Fish described in 1908